The IEEE Signal Processing Society (IEEE SPS) is one of the nearly 40 technical societies of the Institute of Electrical and Electronics Engineers (IEEE) and the first one created.  
Its mission is to "advance and disseminate state-of-the-art scientific information and resources; educate the signal processing community; and provide a venue for people to interact and exchange ideas."

History
The Signal Processing society was formed in 1948 as the Professional Group on Audio of the Institute of Radio Engineers.

Activities
The Society organizes many conferences every year and operates local chapters around the world.  It coordinates the operation of several councils, task forces, and technical committees.

Publications
The Signal Processing Society oversees the publication of nine periodicals, including a magazine, newsletter and scholarly journals:
IEEE Journal of Selected Topics in Signal Processing
IEEE Signal Processing Letters
IEEE Signal Processing Magazine
Inside Signal Processing e-Newsletter
IEEE Transactions on Audio, Speech, and Language Processing
IEEE Transactions on Image Processing
IEEE Transactions on Information Forensics and Security
IEEE Transactions on Signal Processing

Co-sponsored journals include:
IEEE Computing in Science and Engineering Magazine
IEEE MultiMedia Magazine
IEEE Sensors Journal
IEEE Transactions on Medical Imaging
IEEE Transactions on Mobile Computing
IEEE Transactions on Multimedia
IEEE Transactions on Wireless Communications

Digital Library:
Signal Processing electronic Library (SPeL)
The IEEE Signal Processing electronic Library (SPeL) is a comprehensive electronic collection of more than 50 years of the IEEE Signal Processing Society's periodicals, which includes all four transactions and letters, newsletters, magazines, and technical proceedings of the two major Society conferences and of most workshops. IEEE SPeL also features four joint transactions, which the Society is a partner. The library collection is available on three DVD-ROMs. It has a search engine, which allows searches based on full-text, as well as searches by such fields as author, title, subject and date. The collection provides a comprehensive database, which contains information about the technical articles that are published in the Society's journals.

Conferences
The Society organizes, sponsors, and co-sponsors numerous conferences and workshops every year.  A list of them can be found here.

See also
International Conference on Acoustics, Speech, and Signal Processing (ICASSP)
International Conference on Information Processing in Sensor Networks (IPSN)

References

IEEE societies